Jamila is a feminine given name of Arabic origin. It is the feminine form of the masculine Arabic given name Jamil, which comes from the Arabic word jamāl (Arabic: جَمَال), meaning beauty. The name is popular on a global scale, in regular use by both Arabic speaking and non–Arabic speaking populations and holds religious significance for some Muslims. Due to differences in transcription, there are several variations on how to spell the name.

Popularity 
According to the Social Security Administration, the name Jamila was among the 1000 most popular names for baby girls in the United States from 1974 until 1995, with the exception of the year 1985. Its popularity peaked in 1977, when it was the 486th most popular name for baby girls.

Variations 

 Cemile (Turkish)
Cəmilə (Azerbaijani)
 Djamila, Djemila (Algerian Arabic: جميلة)
 Džemila (Bosnian)
 Dzhamilja (Russian: Джамиля)
 Gamila (Egyptian Arabic: جميلة)
 Giamila (Italian)
 Jameela, Jameelah, Jamie Jamila, Jamilla, Jamillah, Jemila, Jemilah, Jemilla, Jemillah, Jemileh, Jemilleh, Mila, Milla, Millie, Milly (English)
 Jamira (Japanese: ジェミラ), Jamīra (Japanese: ジェミーラ)
 Jamila, Jamileth, Jamilex, Jamillette, Yamila, Yamile, Yamilé, Yamilet, Yamileth, Yamilex (Spanish)
 Qamile, Xhemile (Albanian)

People

Sports 
 Cemile Timur (born 1988), Turkish former football player, referee and current team manager
 Djamila Rakhmatova (b. 1990), Uzbekistani rhythmic gymnast
 Jamila Wideman (b. 1975), American basketball player and daughter of John Edgar Wideman
 Yamila Badell (born 1996), Uruguayan soccer player
 Yamila Hernández (b. 1992), Cuban volleyball player
Yamila Nizetich (b. 1989), Argentina volleyball player
Yamila Zambrano (b. 1986), Cuban judoka
Yamile Fors Guerra (b. 1977), Cuban tennis player
Yamilé Martínez (b. 1970), Cuban basketball player
Yamilet Peña (b. 1992), Dominican artistic gymnast

Arts and Entertainment 

 Djemila Benhabib (b. 1972), Ukrainian-born Canadian journalist and writer
 Jameela Jamil (b. 1986), British television presenter and model
 Jamila Afghani (b. 1974), Afghan activist and feminist
 Jamila Cholimbo (b. 1982), American singer-songwriter better known as Mila J
 Jamila Gavin (b. 1941), Indian-born British writer and mother-in-law of Dido
 Jamila Massey (b. 1934), Indian-born British actress and writer
 Jamila Mohammed (b. 1972), Nigerian-born British singer-songwriter better known as Jamila Jemstone
 Jamila Mujahed, Afghan journalist
 Jamila Velazquez (b. 1995), American singer and actress
 Jamila Woods, American singer-songwriter and poet
 Jamilah Kolocotronis (née Linda Kolocotronis), American writer
 Jamilah Lemieux, American editor
 Jamilah Tangaza (b. 1971), Nigerian journalist
 Jamileh Sheykhi (1930-2001), Iranian actress and mother of Atila Pesyani
 Jamillah Ross, Canadian comedian and singer-songwriter
 Jamillah Knowles, Australian journalist better known as Jemimah Knight
 Jamillette Gaxiola (b. 1989), Mexican beauty queen who represented Cuba in Miss Earth 2009
 Yamila Cafrune (b. 1965), Argentine folk singer
 Yamila Diaz-Rahi (b. 1976), Argentine model

Politics 

 Cemile Giousouf (b. 1978), Turkish-German politician
 Jamila Gilani (b. 1960), Pakistani politician and leader of the Pashtun Tahafuz Movement
 Djamila Bouhired (b. 1935), Algerian nationalist
 Jamila Abdallah Taha al-Shanti (b. 1955), Palestinian politician
 Jamila Madeira (b. 1975), Portuguese politician
 Jamilah Nasheed (née Jenise Williams, b. 1972), American politician
Jamila Schäfer (born 1993), German politician

Religion 

 Jamila bint Thabit (née Asiya), companion of Muhammad and wife of Umar
 Jamilah bint Adwan, ancestor of Muhammad

Royalty and Nobility 

 Cemile Sultan (1843-1915), Ottoman] princess and issue of Abdulmejid I
 Jamila "Sarah" Ashley-Cooper, Dowager Countess of Shaftesbury (née Jamila M'Barek, b. c. 1961), French murderer and widow of Anthony Ashley-Cooper, 10th Earl of Shaftesbury

Places
 Djémila, a city in Algeria, formerly known as Cuicul.

Fictional characters
 Jameela, a character in the Geo Entertainment comedic drama Yeh Zindagi Hai.
 Jamila, a fashion doll marketed to children in the Middle East, similar to Barbie and Fulla.
 Jamila Inzamam, a character in the BBC soap opera EastEnders, played by Sara Aisha Kent.
 Jamilah Malik, a character in the BBC Scotland soap opera River City, played by Laxmi Kathuria.
 Jemilla, a character in the musical Firebringer, portrayed by Meredith Stepien.
 “Nana” Jamila, a sidekick character in the video game ‘’FarCry New Dawn’’, is referred to as Jamila by Grace Armstrong.

Films and television
 Jamila, the Algerian, a 1958 Egyptian film based on the life of Djamila Bouhired.

References

Arabic feminine given names
Bosnian feminine given names